Barasat Union is a union parishad in Terokhada Upazila of Khulna District, in Khulna Division, Bangladesh.

References

Unions of Terokhada Upazila
Populated places in Khulna District